Burning Bright is a 1950 experimental novella by John Steinbeck.

Burning Bright may also refer to:
Burning Bright (song), a 2003 single from the post-grunge band Shinedown's debut album Leave a Whisper
Burning Bright (film), a 2010 horror-thriller directed by Carlos Brooks
Burning Bright, a 2007 novel by Tracy Chevalier
"Burning Bright", a song by Phinehas from the 2017 album Dark Flag
The Burning Bright, a 2014 album by Royal Wood